HMS Cheerly (W 153) was a  of the Royal Navy during World War II.

Service history 
Cheerly was laid down in early 1943 at the Levingston Shipbuilding Company in Orange, Texas, as ATR-95, launched 23 July 1943 and commissioned into the Royal Navy as Cheerly under Lend-Lease on 18 January 1944. Cheerly served as a rescue tug with convoys in the English Channel and also Gibraltar convoy ON273. She was returned to the United States Navy on 19 February 1946, struck on 12 April 1946 and sold for merchant service in 1948.

References 

 

1943 ships
Favourite-class tugboats
Ships built in Orange, Texas